The State Science and Technology Prizes are the highest honors conferred by the national government of the People's Republic of China in science and technology, in order to recognize citizens and organizations who have made remarkable contributions to scientific and technological progress, and to promote the development of science and technology. The State Council enacted the Regulations on the State Science and Technology Prizes and established five State prizes in science and technology:

 Highest Science and Technology Award (established in 2000); 
 State Natural Science Award; 
 State Technological Invention Award; 
 State Science and Technology Progress Award ; 
 International Scientific and Technological Cooperation Award of the People's Republic of China

The State Natural Science Award, the State Technological Invention Award and the State Science and Technology Progress Award are classified into two grades, that is, the First Class Award and the Second Class Award.

The Highest Science and Technology Award is awarded by the President of China, while the State Natural Science Award First Class Award is given in person by the Premier.

See also 

 List of general science and technology awards

References

External links
Official Webpage of National Office for Science and Technology Award
 NOSTA.gov.cn in English

Orders, decorations, and medals of the People's Republic of China
People's Republic of China science and technology awards
Academic awards in China